Grant Wooden is an Australian former professional rugby league footballer who played in the 2000s. He played for Manly-Warringah and the Northern Eagles in the NRL competition.

Playing career
Wooden made his first grade debut for the Northern Eagles in round 3 of the 2002 NRL season against South Sydney. Wooden played off the bench in the Northern Eagles 44-20 loss. Wooden played a total of six games for the club including their last ever game which came in round 26 against Penrith where they lost 68-28. Following the conclusion of the 2002 season, the merger between North Sydney and Manly was dissolved with Manly regaining the NRL licence ahead of the 2003 NRL season. Wooden played in Manly's first game back in the NRL since 1999 when they faced off against North Queensland in round 2 of the competition. Wooden played a further three games for Manly before being released. Wooden would later go on to play in the QLD Cup competition and for various NSW Country teams.

References

1979 births
Manly Warringah Sea Eagles players
Northern Eagles players
Australian rugby league players
Rugby league props
Living people